Vincent Cé Ougna (born 3 October 1985) is a French former professional footballer who played as a striker.

He played on the professional level in Ligue 2 for Clermont Foot.

References
 
 Vincent Cé Ougna profile at foot-national.com

1985 births
Living people
Sportspeople from Clermont-Ferrand
French footballers
Association football forwards
Clermont Foot players
Montluçon Football players
Moulins Yzeure Foot players
Luzenac AP players
Red Star F.C. players
Ligue 2 players
Championnat National players
Championnat National 2 players
Footballers from Auvergne-Rhône-Alpes